Onawa is a populated place in the U.S. state of Maine. Onawa is located next to Lake Onawa and lay along the former route of the International Railway of Maine. In 1919, a major train wreck occurred two miles west of the Onawa railway stop.

References

Geography of Piscataquis County, Maine